Mayo Association Football League is an association football league that features amateur and junior clubs from County Mayo. Its top division, the Super League, is a seventh level division in the Republic of Ireland football league system. The two top divisions – the Super League and the Premier Division – are sponsored by Elverys Sports and Welcome Inn Hotel respectively.
Clubs from the league also compete in the FAI Junior Cup and the Connacht Junior Cup. A Mayo League representative team also competes in the League of Ireland Cup.

History
In 1954 Westport Town, Barcastle, Quay Hearts and Castlebar Celtic became the founder members of the Mayo Association Football League. Castlebar Celtic finished the inaugural season as champions and, together with Westport United, they went on to become the league's most successful clubs. During the late 1970s and early 1980s the winners of the league played off against the winners of other Connacht junior leagues for the Michael Byrne Cup. During the 1970s the league expanded to include three divisions. In 1984–85 a league cup was introduced. It was originally known as the Robert Kilkelly Cup, before becoming the AIB Cup and then the Chadwicks Cup. It is currently known as the Connacht Gold Cup. The league originally operated an autumn/winter schedule but a summer season was introduced in May 1994 and it kicked off the following July. The top division became known as the Super League from the 1999 season onwards. In 2022, current Claremorris AFC, and formally Swinford FC Striker, Joe Slevin became the first player in the league’s history to earn back to back relegations with different clubs.

League pyramid

Representative team
A Mayo League representative team competes regularly in the Oscar Traynor Trophy and the Connacht Inter League Cup, playing against teams representing other leagues. In recent seasons they have also competed in the League of Ireland Cup, playing against Connacht/Ulster – based teams from the League of Ireland. As of 2016 they have never progressed past the first round. In 2015 Joseph N'Do was appointed the head coach of the league's representative team.

League of Ireland Cup record

Wins by club

List of Super League winners by season

See also
 Mayo Women's Football League

References

7
Association football in County Mayo
Association football leagues in Connacht
1954 establishments in Ireland
Sports leagues established in 1954
Summer association football leagues